Luna Park is the name of multiple amusement parks (see ).

Luna Park, Lunar Park, or Lunapark may also refer to:

Amusement parks
 Chutes Park (also known as Luna Park), Los Angeles
 Estadio Luna Park, Buenos Aires
 Europark Idroscalo Milano (formerly known as Lunapark), Milan
 Luna Park, Arlington
 Luna Park, Berlin
 Luna Park, Cairo
 Luna Park, Charleston
 Luna Park, Chicago
 Luna Park, Cleveland
 Luna Park (Coney Island, 1903)
 Luna Park (Coney Island, 2010)
 Luna Park, Denver
 Luna Park, Detroit
 Luna Park Glenelg
 Luna Park Hamburg-Altona
 Luna Park, Houston
 Luna Park, Leipzig
 Luna Park, Melbourne
 Luna Park, Olcott Beach
 Luna Park, Osaka
 Luna Park, Paris
 Luna Park, Pittsburgh
 Luna Park, San Jose
 Luna Park, Schenectady
 Luna Park, Scranton
 Luna Park, Seattle
 Luna Park, St. Petersburg
 Luna Park Sydney
 Luna Park, Tel Aviv
 Luna Park, Tokyo
 LunEur (also known as Luna Park Permanente di Roma), Rome
 Shahr-e Bazi (formerly known as Luna Park), Tehran

Films and plays
 Luna Park (1992 film), directed by Pavel Lungin
 Luna Park (1960 film), a 1960 Argentine film
 Luna Park (play), written by Caridad Svich
 Luna Park, a play written by Donald Margulies

Literature
 Luna-Park, a novel by French writer Elsa Triolet
 Lunapark, a 2016 crime novel by German novelist Volker Kutscher
 Luna Park (comics), a graphic novel by Kevin Baker and Danijel Žeželj

Music
 Luna Park, ballet (1930) by Lord Berners
 "Luna Park" (Pet Shop Boys song)
 Luna Park, a 1961 composition by Tod Dockstader

Albums
 Luna Park (2003), by Irish folk group Kíla
 Luna Park (2010), by Portuguese rock band Blind Zero
 Lunapark (album) (1992), by American rock band Luna
 Live at Luna Park (2013), by American progressive metal band Dream Theater

Other uses
 Luna Park, a fictional theme park on the moon in the Futurama episode "The Series Has Landed"
 Luna Park, one of the buildings at Boardwalk Hotel and Casino, Las Vegas, Nevada, US
 Luna Park, the prior name of Cloudland, an entertainment venue formerly in Brisbane, Australia
 Luna Parc, a semi-private museum of multimedia artist Ricky Boscarino

See also
 Lunar Park, a 2005 mock memoir by American novelist Bret Easton Ellis